The 2003–04 ABA season was the third season of the American Basketball Association, and the first season since the league took a year off in 2002 for reorganization. The regular season started in November 2003 and the year ended with the championship game in March 2004 featuring the Long Beach Jam and Kansas City Knights. Long Beach led by Dennis Rodman defeated Kansas City, 126–123 in the championship game to win their first ABA title.

Regular season standings

Playoff Results

References

American Basketball Association (2000–present) seasons
ABA